XEAK-AM/XHAK-FM is a combo radio station in Mexico, broadcasting at 890 AM and 89.7 FM in Acámbaro, Guanajuato. It is known as La Mejor and is owned by Organización Radiofónica de Acámbaro along with XHVW-FM 90.5.

History

Callsign
XEAK were also the original call letters of a border-blaster radio station licensed to the Tijuana / Rosarito area of the Mexican state of Baja California. Branded as The Mighty 690, the original XEAK was one of the first rock music stations to broadcast to Southern California. The Tijuana station dropped the XEAK call sign in 1961, but continues to broadcast today with the call sign XEWW-AM.

In Acámbaro

The XEAK calls returned when a new XEAK-AM was authorized in 1980, this time in Acámbaro, Guanajuato, to Sergio Fajardo Ortiz. The station initially received authorization to operate on 1600 kHz, soon sliding down to 890.

The FM migration was authorized in 2013. In 2017, XHAK and XHVW picked up MVS Radio formats.

See also
Border blaster

References

External links
Border Radio by Fowler, Gene and Crawford, Bill.  Texas Monthly Press, Austin. 1987 
Mass Media Moments in the United Kingdom, the USSR and the USA, by Gilder, Eric. - "Lucian Blaga" University of Sibiu Press, Romania. 2003 
Radio Consentida
Dedication of the Wolfman Jack Memorial in Del Rio, Texas
Radio Consentida Online

Radio stations in Guanajuato
Radio stations established in 1980